Faris Abdi (born May 9, 1999), is a Saudi Arabian international footballer who plays for Al-Qadsiah and the Saudi Arabia national team.

Early life 
Faris Abdi was born on  May 9, 1999, in San Diego, California and is the son of Rifat Abdi and Soulafa Al Nassar. Abdi was raised in Dhahran, Eastern Province, Saudi Arabia. Abdi went to high school at IMG Academy and there continued to play soccer. As a senior Abdi won the award of the MVP of his team and best attacking player.

International career
Having scored two goals in two games for the  United States under-18 side in June 2017, Abdi was called up to the Saudi Arabia national team side for friendlies against Jamaica and Ghana in late 2017. He made his debut against Jamaica, coming on as a 71st minute substitute for Salem Al-Dawsari.

Career statistics

Club

Notes

International

References

External links
 Faris Abdi at the IMG Academy

1999 births
Living people
People from Dhahran
Soccer players from San Diego
American people of Saudi Arabian descent
Saudi Arabian men's footballers
Saudi Arabian expatriate footballers
Saudi Arabia international footballers
American men's soccer players
United States men's youth international soccer players
Association football midfielders
Association football fullbacks
FC Lausanne-Sport players
Austin Bold FC players
Al-Wehda Club (Mecca) players
Al-Qadsiah FC players
Saudi Arabian expatriate sportspeople in the United States
Saudi Arabian expatriate sportspeople in Switzerland
American expatriate sportspeople in Switzerland
Expatriate footballers in Switzerland
USL Championship players
Saudi Professional League players
Saudi First Division League players